Olivier Rambo (born 8 September 1974) is a French footballer who currently plays as an attacking midfielder for AS Illzach Modenheim. While playing for AS Nancy he made 78 appearances in Ligue 1, the highest tier of French football.

References
 
 

1974 births
Living people
People from La Trinité, Martinique
French footballers
Martiniquais footballers
Association football midfielders
AS Nancy Lorraine players
SC Toulon players
Ligue 1 players
AS Illzach Modenheim players
French people of Martiniquais descent